The Men's 10K race at the 2006 FINA World Open Water Swimming Championships was swum on Thursday, August 31, 2006, in Naples, Italy. It was the third event of the 2006 Open Water Worlds, and one of two events on August 31 (the other being the Women's 10K race). 39 men were entered in the event, 37 of whom swam.

Results
All times in hours : minutes : seconds

See also
2004 FINA World Open Water Swimming Championships – Men's 10K
Open water swimming at the 2007 World Aquatics Championships – Men's 10 km
2008 FINA World Open Water Swimming Championships – Men's 10K

References

Fina World Open Water Swimming Championships - Mens 10k, 2006
World Open Water Swimming Championships